Muzi Koti-ye Olya (also Romanized as Mūzī Kotī-ye ‘Olyā; also known as Mūzī Gotī-ye Bālā and Mūzīkūtī-ye Bālā) is a village in Dabuy-ye Jonubi Rural District, Dabudasht District, Amol County, Mazandaran Province, Iran. At the 2006 census, its population was 149, in 37 families.

References 

Populated places in Amol County